Adolfo Horta (3 October 1957 – 28 November 2016) was a Cuban amateur boxer, who won the silver medal in the Men's Featherweight division (– 57 kg) at age 22 at the 1980 Summer Olympics in Moscow. He was beaten by East Germany's Rudi Fink on points (1-4). Horta won eleven consecutive national championships and three gold medals in the World Amateur Boxing Championships in different weight classes, but he would never return to the Olympics, as Cuba boycotted the 1984 Summer Olympics.

1980 Olympic results
Round of 64: bye
Round of 32: Odd Bengtsson (Sweden) by decision, 5-0
Round of 16: Titi Cercel (Romania) by decision, 5-0
Quarterfinal: Defeated Luis Pizarro (Puerto Rico) by decision, 5-0
Semifinal: Defeated Krysztof Kosedowski (Poland) by walkover
Final: Lost to Rudi Fink (East Germany) by decision, 1-4 (was awarded silver medal)

References

Further reading 
Amateur Record (Archived 2009-10-24)

1957 births
2016 deaths
People from Santiago de Cuba Province
Pan American Games gold medalists for Cuba
Olympic boxers of Cuba
Boxers at the 1979 Pan American Games
Boxers at the 1983 Pan American Games
Boxers at the 1980 Summer Olympics
Olympic silver medalists for Cuba
Olympic medalists in boxing
Medalists at the 1980 Summer Olympics
Cuban male boxers
AIBA World Boxing Championships medalists
Pan American Games medalists in boxing
Bantamweight boxers
Medalists at the 1979 Pan American Games
Medalists at the 1983 Pan American Games